Bride with a Dowry is a 1953 Soviet comedy film directed by Tatyana Lukashevich and Boris Ravenskih.

Plot 
The film tells about the couple in love with brigade leaders who suddenly quarreled and began to compete with each other, which significantly increased the yield and they are together again.

Starring 
 Vera Vasilyeva
 Vladimir Ushakov
 Vladimir Dorofeyev
 Galina Kozhakina
 Mikhail Dorokhin
 Vitali Doronin
 Kira Kanaeva as Galya
 L. Kuzmichyova
 Tatyana Pelttser as Lukerya Pokhlyobkina

References

External links 
 

1953 films
1950s Russian-language films
Soviet comedy films
1953 comedy films